Card Players in a Rich Interior is a c. 1663 – 1665 oil on canvas painting by Pieter de Hooch, produced at the start of his time in Amsterdam and signed "P. D. HOOCH". It is now in the Louvre, whose collections it entered in 1801.

It reworks a theme used in earlier works by the artist such as Soldiers Playing Cards (1657–1658; private collection) and Card Players in a Bright Interior (1658; Windsor Castle, Royal Collection) He also returned to the theme in the later Card Players at a Table (1670–1674; private collection).

Bibliography

Peter C. Sutton, Pieter de Hooch, Complete edition, Oxford, Phaidon, 1980, p. 93-94.
Peter C. Sutton, Pieter de Hooch, 1629–1684, London, Yale University Press, 1998–1999, p. 26-28.

Paintings in the Louvre by Dutch, Flemish and German artists
Paintings by Pieter de Hooch
1660s paintings